John Worthen may refer to:
 John Worthen (literary critic), professor of D.H. Lawrence studies
 John E. Worthen, president of Ball State University, and president of Indiana University of Pennsylvania